Isidro Sala Puigdevall (29 September 1940 – 21 September 2022) was a Spanish footballer who played as a central defender for Girona. He competed in the men's tournament at the 1968 Summer Olympics.

Career
Sala spent 13 seasons with Girona in the Tercera División, making a club record 432 appearances, and captained the side.

Legacy
The Catalan Football Federation awarded him the Silver Medal for Sports Merit in 1976.

Personal life and death
Sala's family had a farm in Vilamalla. He died on 21 September 2022, at the age of 81.

References

External links
 
 

1940 births
2022 deaths
People from Alt Empordà
Sportspeople from the Province of Girona
Spanish footballers
Footballers from Catalonia
Association football central defenders
Olympic footballers of Spain
Footballers at the 1968 Summer Olympics
Tercera División players
Girona FC players